Toshio Murashige is a professor emeritus of University of California Riverside in plant biology.

He is most widely known for his efforts in creating the plant tissue culture medium known as Murashige and Skoog medium.

References

External links 
Listing at UCR

University of California, Riverside faculty
Living people
Year of birth missing (living people)